Nikhil Wairagar (born 12 February 1991) is an Indian actor and singer who is popularly known for his hit song "Bai Wadyawer Ya" from the feature film Jalsa.

Early life
He was born in Pune on 12 February 1991. After completing his schooling in AW Sindhu Vidya Bhavan he pursued a commerce degree in Marathwada Mitra Mandal College of Commerce.

Career
Wairagar started his career with English-language plays such as Fiddler on the Roof. He also did Marathi plays and eakankika from various colleges. He made his first Marathi film, Headline, which was based on youth issues such as good and bad uses of social media. The film included other actors such as Prasad Oak, Shashwati Pimplikar, and Pooja Pawar.

After making his debut he went on to be part of hit films like Ek Thriller Night, alongside Ashmit Patel, Sanskruti Balgude, and Khushboo Tawde; Jalsa and will be seen in an upcoming film, Gatmat, which is in post-production.
His latest solo hit song "Limbonich Limbu" has been quite popular.

Filmography

References

1991 births
Indian male film actors
Living people
Male actors from Pune